Miastor is a genus of gall midges and wood midges in the family Cecidomyiidae. There are about seven described species in Miastor.

Species
These seven species belong to the genus Miastor:
 Miastor agricolae Marshall, 1896
 Miastor castaneae Wyatt, 1967
 Miastor difficilis Marshall, 1896
 Miastor mastersi Skuse, 1888
 Miastor metraloas Meinert, 1864
 Miastor procax Skuse, 1888
 † Aprionus vlaskini (Fedotova & Perkovsky, 2007)

References

Further reading

 
 
 
 
 

Cecidomyiidae genera
Articles created by Qbugbot